Nizhny Karanay is a rural locality (a selo) in Verkhnekaranayevsky Selsoviet, Buynaksky District, Republic of Dagestan, Russia. The population was 192 as of 2010. There are 5 streets.

Geography 
Nizhny Karanay is located 17 km west of Buynaksk (the district's administrative centre) by road. Verkhneye Ishkarty is the nearest rural locality.

References 

Rural localities in Buynaksky District